Mallavaram may refer to:

Places 
Mallavaram, Prakasam district, a village in Prakasam district, Andhra Pradesh, India
A. Mallavaram, a village in East Godavari district, Andhra Pradesh, India
P. Mallavaram, a village in Thallarevu mandal, East Godavari district, Andhra Pradesh, India